Melany Aylín Villeda Medina (born 25 October 2001) is a Mexican footballer who plays as a goalkeeper for Liga MX Femenil club UNAM and the Mexico women's national team.

Early life
Villeda was born in Iztacalco, Mexico City.

Club career
Villeda has played for UNAM in Mexico.

International career
Villeda was a non-playing squad member for the Mexico women's national under-17 football team at the 2018 FIFA U-17 Women's World Cup.

Villeda made her debut for the senior Mexico women's national team on 23 February 2021, as a 67th-minute substitution in a 0–0 friendly home draw against Costa Rica at Centro de Alto Rendimiento in Mexico City.

References

External links 
 

2001 births
Living people
Footballers from Mexico City
Mexican women's footballers
Women's association football goalkeepers
Club Universidad Nacional (women) footballers
Liga MX Femenil players
Mexico women's international footballers
Mexican footballers